Jag vet en dejlig rosa is an old Scandinavian folksong, which was written down lyrically in the 16th-century. The song was published in 1907 by Alice Tegnér.

Recordings 

The most renowned version was performed by Monica Zetterlund, and the record was released in 1964.
  
Swedish singer Robyn featured a cover of the song on her album titled Body Talk Pt. 1.

The song has also been performed in Arabic by Gina Dirawi in Melodifestivalen 2016.

References 

Swedish-language songs
Swedish folk songs